The Norwegian Allround Championships are organized by the Norges Skøyteforbund (Norwegian Skating Association).

Men's result

1887-1893 Unofficial
Only one distance was skated, the 5000 meter.
The winner was Norwegian Champion.

 NC = Not classified
Source: skoyteforbundet.no

1894-1911
Three distances were skated, the 500, 1500 and 5000 meter.

 NC = Not classified

Source: skoyteforbundet.no

1912-Current

Four distances were skated, the 500, 1500, 5000 and 10000 meter.

Source: skoyteforbundet.no

Women's result

1932 Unofficial
Three distances were skated, the 500, 1000 and 1500 meter.

Source: skoyteforbundet.no

1933-1936
Three distances were skated, the 500, 1000 and 1500 meter.

Source: skoyteforbundet.no

1937-1982
Four distances were skated, the 500, 1000, 1500 and 3000 meter

Source: skoyteforbundet.no

1983-Current

Four distances were skated, the 500, 1500, 3000 and 5000 meter

Source: skoyteforbundet.no

References 

Norwegian Speed Skating Championships
Sports competitions in Norway